Coleophora nemorella is a moth of the family Coleophoridae. It is found in Canada, including Nova Scotia.

The larvae feed on the seeds of Oclemena nemoralis. They create a trivalved, tubular silken case.

References

nemorella
Moths described in 1956
Moths of North America